Lalabad-e Seyyed Sadeq (also Romanized as La‘lābād-e Seyyed Şādeq) is a village in Mahidasht Rural District, Mahidasht District, Kermanshah County, Kermanshah Province, Iran. At the 2006 census, its population was 183, in 36 families.

References 

Populated places in Kermanshah County